The 2009–10 Handball-Bundesliga is the 45th season of the Handball-Bundesliga, Germany's premier handball league.

League table

Key

References

External links 
 Kicker magazine 

2009–10 domestic handball leagues
2009-10
2010 in German sport
2009 in German sport